Khanik (also Romanized as Khānīk; also known as Khūnīk, Khūnag, Khung, and Khūnīg) is a village in Kakhk Rural District, Kakhk District, Gonabad County, Razavi Khorasan Province, Iran. At the 2006 census, its population was 350, in 169 families.

References 

Populated places in Gonabad County